Lintong District, formerly Lintong County, is one of 11 urban districts of the prefecture-level city of Xi'an, the capital of Shaanxi Province, Northwest China. The district was approved to establish from the former Lintong County by the Chinese State Council on June 25, 1997. The Terracotta Army and the Mausoleum of the First Qin Emperor was discovered in March 1974 near this district. The district borders the prefecture-level cities of Xianyang to the northwest and Weinan to the east, Gaoling County to the northeast, Baqiao District to the southeast, Lianhu and Xincheng Districts to the south, and Chang'an District to the southwest.

Artifacts from the tomb of Qin Shi Huang, China's first emperor, can be viewed at the Emperor Qinshihuang's Mausoleum Site Museum in Lintong District.

The National Time Service Center, the Chinese Academy of Sciences, formerly known as Shaanxi Astronomical Observatory, was established in 1966 in Lintong responsible for the time standard in mainland China. It was renamed to its present name in 2001.

The name of the district comes from two rivers.  Lin river is on the east side and Tong river is on the west side of the district.

Lintong is headquarters of the 47th Group Army of the People's Liberation Army, one of the two group armies that comprise the Lanzhou Military Region responsible for defending China's northwest borders.

Administrative divisions
As 2020, Lintong District is divided to 23 subdistricts.
Subdistricts

References

External links
Official website of Lintong District Government

Districts of Xi'an